This is a list of foreign players in Superettan, which commenced play in 2000. The following players must meet both of the following two criteria:
have played at least one Superettan game. Players who were signed by Superettan clubs, but only played in lower league, cup and/or European games, or did not play in any competitive games at all, are not included.
are considered foreign, determined by the following:
A player is considered foreign if he is not eligible to play for Sweden national football team.

List of players

Afghanistan
 Norlla Amiri – Trelleborgs – 2016–2017

Armenia
 Levon Pachajyan – Assyriska – 2013–2014

Bosnia and Herzegovina
 Admir Aganović – Assyriska – 2013–
 Dragan Kapčević – Brage, Husqvarna – 2012–
 Aleksandar Kitić – Ljungskile – 2005–2007, 2009–

Brazil

 Daniel Bamberg – Norrköping – 2006–2007, 2009–2010
 Diego Brum – Syrianska – 2014, 2018
 Wílton Figueiredo – GAIS – 2005
 Genalvo – Ljungskile – 2009–2012
 Willian Gerlem – Syrianska – 2014
 Paulinho Guará – Hammarby – 2011
 Bruno Manoel Marinho – Åtvidaberg – 2008–2009, 2011
 Caio Mendes – Norrköping, Brage, GAIS – 2010, 2012
 Daniel Mendes – Kalmar, Degerfors, GAIS – 2003, 2006, 2013
 Paulinho – Häcken – 2007–2008
 Rafael Porcellis – Värnamo – 2011
 Álvaro Santos – Örgryte – 2010
 Bruno Santos – Norrköping, Ljungskile – 2004–2007, 2010–2012
 Igor Santos Koppe – Syrianska – 2014–2015, 2016
 Ricardo Santos – Åtvidaberg, Jönköpings Södra – 2008–2009
 Álberis da Silva – Åtvidaberg – 2009, 2011
 Danilo de Souza – Assyriska – 2011–2014

Cameroon
 Hervé Tchami – Värnamo – 2014

Canada

 Nikolas Ledgerwood – Hammarby – 2012–2013

Chile
 Diego Olate – Husqvarna – 2014–
 Juan Robledo – Mjällby, Värnamo – 2008–2009, 2014–
 Carlos Ross – Husqvarna – 2014–

Comoros
 Fouad Bachirou – Östersund – 2014–

DR Congo
 Richard Ekunde – Åtvidaberg, GAIS – 2003–2005, 2014–

Croatia
 Luka Perić – Östersund – 2014–

Czech Republic
 Pavel Zavadil – Mjällby, Öster, Örgryte – 2005, 2007–2008, 2010

Denmark
 Thomas Guldborg Christensen – Hammarby – 2012–
 Anders Nielsen – Husqvarna – 2014–
 Niclas Rønne – Landskrona – 2014–
 Cheikh Sarr – Hammarby, Landskrona – 2011, 2014–

El Salvador
 Dustin Corea – Jönköpings Södra – 2012

England

 James Baldwin – Östersund – 2014–
 Dominic Furness – Ljungskile – 2014–
 Jamie Hopcutt – Östersund – 2013–
 Taylor Morgan – Östersund – 2013–
 Connor Ripley – Östersund – 2014–
 James Sinclair – Ljungskile – 2013–

Estonia
 Martin Vunk – Syrianska – 2010

Ethiopia
 Yussuf Saleh – Syrianska – 2010, 2014–

Faroe Islands
 Finnur Justinussen – Jönköpings Södra – 2012

Finland
 Magnus Bahne – Assyriska – 2011
 Fredrik Nordback – Örebro – 2005–2006
 Jukka Sauso – Örgryte, Jönköpings Södra – 2007, 2010–2011
 Henri Scheweleff – Örgryte – 2007
 Fredrik Svanbäck – Landskrona – 2010–2013

Gambia

 Kebba Ceesay – Dalkurd – 2017–
 Mohamed Mbye – Assyriska – 2009–2013
 Aziz Corr Nyang – Åtvidaberg, Assyriska, GIF Sundsvall, Brommapojkarna – 2004, 2008–2012
 Alagie Sosseh – Landskrona, Väsby United – 2009–2010
 Pa Dembo Touray – Djurgården, Assyriska – 2000–2002

Germany
 Orhan Aktas – Husqvarna – 2014–

Ghana
 Thomas Boakye – Östersund – 2013–
 Derek Boateng – AIK – 2005
 Benjamin Fadi – Värnamo – 2014–

Guinea-Bissau
 José Monteiro de Macedo – Hammarby – 2010–2012

Iceland

 Ásgeir Börkur Ásgeirsson – GAIS – 2014–
 Jón Guðni Fjóluson – GIF Sundsvall – 2013–
 Garðar Gunnlaugsson – Norrköping – 2006–2007
 Hannes Þorsteinn Sigurðsson – GIF Sundsvall – 2009–2010
 Rúnar Már Sigurjónsson – GIF Sundsvall – 2013–
 Ari Freyr Skúlason – Häcken, GIF Sundsvall – 2007, 2009–2013
 Steinþór Freyr Þorsteinsson – Örgryte – 2010
 Davíð Viðarsson – Öster – 2010–2012

Iran

 Arash Talebinejad – Västra Frölunda, AIK, Brommapojkarna – 2001–2002, 2005, 2008
 Arash Bayat – Västra Frölunda, Sundsvall, Qviding, Ljungskile – 2001–2005, 2006–2007, 2009, 2010
 Ali Mohammadian – Trollhättan – 2009–2010
 Koyar Salimi – Västerås – 2011
 Omid Nazari – Ängelholm – 2011–2014
 Amin Nazari – Assyriska, Falkenbergs – 2013, 2017
 William Atashkadeh – Örebro, Örgryte – 2013, 2016–2018
 Saman Ghoddos – Syrianska – 2014–2015
 Karvan Ahmadi – Sirius – 2015
 Navid Nasseri – Syrianska – 2017–2018
 Arvin Shojaee – GAIS – 2017

Iraq
 Brwa Nouri – Åtvidaberg, Eskilstuna, Östersund – 2006, 2008, 2014–2015

Jamaica
 Dwayne Miller – Syrianska – 2010

Liberia
 Isaac Pupo – Hammarby – 2011
 Amadaiya Rennie – Degerfors, Hammarby – 2011–

Mexico
 Éder López Carreras – Östersund – 2013–
 Alexis Mendiola – GIF Sundsvall, Östersund – 2011, 2013–

Moldova
 Gheorghe Andronic – Värnamo, Degerfors – 2011–2012

Montenegro
 Semir Agović – Husqvarna – 2014
 Zoran Aković – Husqvarna – 2014
 Uroš Delić – Syrianska – 2014

Montserrat
 Alex Dyer – Östersund – 2014–

Netherlands
 Othman El Kabir – Ängelholm – 2013–2014
 Michael Timisela – Hammarby – 2013–2014

New Zealand
 Steven Old – Ljungskile – 2014–
 Jarrod Smith – Ljungskile – 2011

Nigeria

 Oke Akpoveta – Frej, Dalkurd, Helsingborg – 2016–
 Kevin Amuneke – Öster – 2011–2012
 Alhaji Gero – Öster – 2014–
 Peter Ijeh – Syrianska – 2010
 Paul Obiefule – Assyriska – 2013
 Moses Ogbu – Sirius – 2014–
 Nsima Peter – Varberg – 2013–
 Monday Samuel – Ängelholm – 2012–

Northern Ireland
 Daryl Smylie – Jönköpings Södra – 2009–

Norway

 Christian Brink – GIF Sundsvall – 2009–2011
 Eirik Dybendal – Häcken, Norrköping – 2003–2004, 2006–2010
 Dinko Felić – Syrianska – 2009–2010, 2014–
 Lars Fuhre – Hammarby – 2014–
 Petter Furuseth – Assyriska, Hammarby – 2009–2011
 Roger Risholt – Häcken, GIF Sundsvall – 2007, 2011
 Lars Sætra – Hammarby – 2014–
 Jan Gunnar Solli – Hammarby – 2014–
 Fredrik Torsteinbø – Hammarby – 2014–

Palestine
 Imad Zatara – Syrianska – 2009–2010
 Ahmed Awad – IFK Värnamo, Dalkurd – 2013, 2016–

Poland
 Zeyn Alabidyn S-Latef – Ängelholm – 2012–2016

Rwanda

 Olivier Karekezi – Öster – 2010–2011

Serbia
 Nikola Grubješić – Syrianska – 2014–
 Marko Mihajlović – Umeå, Brage, Hammarby – 2012–

Sierra Leone
 Mohamed Bangura – Dalkurd – 2017–
 Samuel Barlay – Örgryte – 2007
 Alhaji Kamara – Värnamo – 2013
 Ibrahim Koroma – Trelleborg, Varberg – 2012–
 Sheriff Suma – Åtvidaberg, Jönköping – 2005–2006, 2010–2011
 Donald Wellington – Värnamo – 2011

Slovakia
 Tomáš Peciar – Östersund – 2014–

South Africa
 Amethyst Bradley Ralani – Landskrona – 2010–
 Jabu Mahlangu Pule – Öster – 2010

South Korea
 Moon Seon-min – Östersund – 2012–

Syria
 Louay Chanko – Syrianska – 2014–2017
 Imad Chhadeh – Åtvidaberg, Brommapojkarna, Assyriska – 2002–2006, 2008, 2011
 Elias Merkes – Assyriska – 2006, 2008, 2010

Turkey
 Isa Bagci
 Ceyhun Eriş – Assyriska – 2010, 2012

Ukraine
 Vyacheslav Jevtushenko – Brage – 2010–2012

United States

 Alex De John – Dalkurd – 2017–2018
 Patrick Hopkins – Ljungskile, Sirius – 2012–2013, 2014-2016
 Alex Horwath – Ljungskile – 2014
 Aaron Nichols – Ljungskile – 2013–2015
 Brandon McDonald – Ljungskile – 2014
 Eric Pothast – Ängelholm – 2014–2015
 Matt Pyzdrowski – Ängelholm, Helsingborg, Varberg – 2011–2014, 2017, 2018
 Andrew Stadler – Landskrona, Östersund, Dalkurd, Syrianska – 2014, 2015, 2017, 2019
 Paul Torres – Landskrona, Sirius, Assyriska, Syrianska – 2014, 2016, 2019
 Bobby Warshaw – Ängelholm, GAIS – 2013, 2014

Zambia
 Boyd Mwila – Örgryte, Trollhättan – 2007–2008, 2010
 Edwin Phiri – Ljungskile – 2006–2007, 2009–2010

Notes

References

See also
List of Superettan players
List of foreign Allsvenskan players

 
Sweden
 
Lists of association football players by club in Sweden
Association football player non-biographical articles